Urola is a genus of moths of the family Crambidae.

Species
Urola fimbrialis (Dyar, 1914)
Urola furvicornis (Zeller, 1877)
Urola nivalis Drury, 1773

References

Natural History Museum Lepidoptera genus database

Argyriini
Crambidae genera
Taxa named by Francis Walker (entomologist)